The 1964 Florida gubernatorial election was held on November 3, 1964. Incumbent Democratic Governor C. Farris Bryant was ineligible for a second consecutive full term under the 1885 State Constitution. Democratic nominee W. Haydon Burns defeated Republican nominee Charles R. Holley with 56.12% of the vote.

Primary elections
Primary elections were held on May 5 and 26, 1964.

Democratic primary

Results

Republican primary

Results

General election

Candidates
W. Haydon Burns, Democratic
Charles R. Holley, Republican

Results

References

1964
Florida
Gubernatorial
November 1964 events in the United States